Belgian nationalism, sometimes pejoratively referred to as Belgicism, is a nationalist ideology. In its modern form it favours the reversal of federalism and the creation of a unitary state in Belgium. The ideology advocates reduced or no autonomy for the Flemish Community who constitute Flanders, the French Community of Belgium and the German-speaking Community of Belgium who constitute Wallonia and the Brussels-Capital Region which is inhabited by both Walloons and Flemings, and the dissolution of the regional counterparts of each ethnic group within Belgium. 

It insists on restoring total sovereignty to the level of the Belgian state by reverting Belgium to a unitary state, after decades of state structure reforms that made Belgium a federal state since the 1970s - contrary to Flemish nationalists who advocate the independence of their region, and Walloon, Brussels and German-speaking regionalists who advocate more autonomy to their respective regions. Belgian nationalists advocate the unity between all language groups in Belgium, and condemn each perceived chauvinistic or linguistic discrimination, advocate the knowledge of all official languages (Dutch, French, German) and a multicultural, tolerant, strong feeling of citizenship.

Belgian nationalism is mainly supported by French-speaking politicians and certain circles in Brussels and also some sections of the far right. Because the Flanders region is by large majority regionalist (although the majority in Flanders do not favor independence of their region) and because both the Wallonia and Brussels regions and the German community are also by majority regionalist, there is no popular support for Belgian nationalism in any region of Belgium, and political parties that support this ideology openly have not gained electoral support in recent years, so it remains much weaker than the secessionist and regional nationalisms of the ethnic groups.

Advocates

Current
 Belgian Union (BUB), a centrist Unionist political party, officially bilingual but in practice mainly Dutch-speaking.
 Vivant, Belgian French-speaking liberal political party incorporates a civic nationalist programme, that advocates bilingualism.

Past
 Front National (National Front) Belgian French-speaking nationalist far-right political party, was advocating Belgian nationalism, and also tried to attract Flemish voters. The party ceased to exist in 2012.
 Historically, both the fascist (Francophone) Rexist Party and (Dutch-speaking) Verdinaso both advocated a version of  corporatist identity centered on Belgian nationalism, until they were banned for collaboration with Nazi Germany after the Second World War.

See also
Flemish nationalism - an ideology calling for greater autonomy or independence for Flanders
Walloon nationalism - an ideology calling for greater autonomy or independence for Wallonia
Rattachism - an ideology calling for the separation of Wallonia and its incorporation in France
Greater Netherlands - a hypothetical polity incorporating Flanders and the Netherlands.
Flamingant - an originally pejorative term for adherents to the Flemish Movement

References 

 
Politics of Belgium
Society of Belgium
Federalism by country